Christhu Charithaya is a 1990 Sri Lankan Sinhala biographical film directed by Sunil Ariyaratne and produced by Alerik Lionel Fernando. It stars Vijaya Kumaratunga as Jesus along with ensemble cast of popular film artists. Music composed by Premasiri Khemadasa. It is the 712th Sri Lankan film in the Sinhala cinema.

The film is based on the life of Jesus Christ until crucifixion. It was the first Sinhala film based on Christianity and directed by a Buddhist.

Production
The script of the film was written by Sunil Ariyaratne in 1980 under the guidance of film producer Alerik Lionel Fernando. They both agreed to choose Vijaya Kumaratunga as the lead role. The film shooting was started in 1981 under several controversies. However after in July 1982, the Sri Lanka Catholic Council appointed an Advisory Committee consisting of four priests. The Sinhalese section of the Catholic doctrine of the Chilaw Padaviya has sent a memorandum to the President and requested that the work of the Christian character be stopped immediately. Finally, on March 23, 1983, the cabinet bans the producing of the film. In the meantime, after the film began, threatening letters were ordered to stop the film. The principle character, Vijaya Kumaratunga, who was suspected of being a Naxalite, had been remanded by the then government, his image was shown on television and the publicity of his voice and name on the radio had been banned.

Post production of the film was started in mid-1982 at Hendala Vijaya Studios. The screenplay of the film was first released as a Sirisumana Godage publication. It was re-released with 22 color photographs.

Plot

Cast
 Vijaya Kumaratunga as Jesus Christ
 Stefan Abeyesinhe as Baby Jesus
 Menik Kurukulasuriya as Mary Magdalene
 Rex Kodippili as Pontius Pilate
 Neil Alles as Judas
 Nathali Anne Greet as Mary, mother of Jesus
 Prasanna Wickramasinghe as Joseph
 Rosy Senanayake 
 Roy de Silva as Caiaphas
 Sathischandra Edirisinghe as Peduru
 Inoka Amarasena as Veronica
 Vishaka Siriwardana as Martha
 Dayananda Jayawardena as 1st Herod
 Sumana Amarasinghe as Herodias
 Samanthi Lanerolle as Bethlehem girl
 Hyacinth Wijeratne as Anna
 Mervyn Jayathunga as 2nd Herod
 Lakshman Mallawarachchi as Thomas
 Baptist Fernando as Annas
 Alexander Fernando as Nikandevumas
 Ananda Wickramage as Joseph of Arimathea
 Tissa Wijesurendra as Simeon
 Vijaya Nandasiri as Shadipathiya
 Vincent Vaas as Vandana Nadaya leader
 Somy Rathnayake as Snawaka Juwam
 Sumana Gomes as Salomi
 Piyatillaka Atapattu 
 Senaka Perera 
 Arthur Gunawardena as Kireniye Simone
 Ranjan Ramanayake 
 Nimal Pallewatte as Soldier
 Wilson Karunaratne as Left side thief
 Premasiri Kalpage 
 Suneetha Wimalaweera

References

1990 films
1990s Sinhala-language films
Films set in Sri Lanka (1948–present)